Ladies' evening gloves or opera gloves are a type of formal glove that reaches beyond the elbow.

Ladies' gloves for formal and semi-formal wear come in three lengths for women: wrist, elbow, and opera or full-length (over the elbow, usually reaching to the biceps but sometimes to the full length of the arm).

The most expensive full-length gloves are custom-made of kidskin. Many other types of leather, most usually soft varieties of cowhide, are used in making full-length gloves; patent leather and suede are especially popular as alternatives to kidskin, and are often more affordable than kidskin. Satin and stretch satin materials are extremely popular, and there are mass-produced varieties as well. More unusual glove materials include leathers made from salmon, python, and stingray.

History

Western world
While the etymology of the term opera glove is unknown, gloves of above-the-elbow length have been worn since at least the late 18th century, and gloves reaching to or just below the elbow have been worn by women in Western countries since the 17th century; in an extant engraving of England's Queen Mary dating from the 1690s she is shown wearing elbow-length gloves. Over-the-elbow gloves were first widely popular during the Regency/Napoleonic period (circa 1800–1825), and waned in popularity during the early and mid-Victorian periods (circa 1830–1870), but enjoyed their greatest vogue in the last two decades of the 19th century and the years of the 20th century prior to the start of World War I. During that period, they were standard for both daytime and evening wear; even some swimming costumes were accessorized with opera gloves. Etiquette considered gloves to be mandatory accessories for both men and women of the upper classes, so it was uncommon to see a well-dressed woman at a public occasion who was not wearing gloves of some sort. According to several fashion historians, over-the-elbow gloves were re-popularized during the late 19th century by actresses Sarah Bernhardt in France (to disguise what she considered her overly thin arms) and Lillian Russell in the United States.

The opera glove has enjoyed varying popularity in the decades since World War I, being most prevalent as a fashion accessory in the 1940s through the early 1960s, but continues to this day to be popular with women who want to add a particularly elegant touch to their formal attire. They have enjoyed minor revivals in fashion design on several occasions, being popular in haute couture collections in the late 2000s. Opera gloves continue to be popular accessories for bridal, prom, debutante, and quinceañera gowns and at very formal ballroom dances (white opera gloves are still mandatory for female debutantes at the Vienna Opera Ball).

They are sometimes worn by entertainers such as can-can dancers and burlesque performers in particular during the performance of a Gown-and-glove striptease. In popular culture, probably the best-known images incorporating opera gloves are those of Rita Hayworth in Gilda (1946) Marilyn Monroe in Gentlemen Prefer Blondes (1953), Cinderella from Disney's 1950 film Cinderella and Audrey Hepburn in Breakfast at Tiffany's.

Japan
In Japan, some ladies wear long gloves all day in summer, to protect the ideal , or fair skin, which represents beauty, grace, and high social status (as well as purity and divinity in local religions), and avoid any form of tanning.

Types

Mousquetaire

The best-known type of opera glove, the mousquetaire, is given this name due to the wrist-level opening (most commonly three inches long) which is closed by three (usually) buttons or snap closures, most frequently made of pearl or some lookalike material. The mousquetaire is originally derived from the gauntlets worn by French musketeers of the 16th and 17th centuries.

Mousquetaire gloves have buttons at the wrist so the wearer could open the buttons and slip her hand out without taking the whole glove off. The finger section would be folded in and kept away tidily. This is how ladies wore gloves while dining. After the meal they would put their hands back into the gloves, usually for the rest of the evening. During the 19th century, especially from the mid-Victorian era onwards, gloves were tailored so as to fit very tightly onto the hands and arms—so tightly, in fact, that it was often necessary to use aids such as talcum powder and buttonhooks to put on one's gloves; therefore, it was considered somewhat uncouth to put on or remove one's gloves completely in public and women would make sure to don their gloves in the privacy of their homes before going out to some event (another reason for the popularity of the mousquetaire opening). The mousquetaire opening/fastening for women's long gloves seems to have become most popular during the Victorian era; during the Napoleonic/Regency period, women's long gloves were often tailored to fit loosely on the wearer's arm, and were often worn gathered below the elbow or held up on the biceps with a garter-like strap. (In the 2005 film version of Pride and Prejudice, Rosamund Pike and several other actresses wear opera-length gloves with drawstring ties at the top of the glove, but this might not be an accurate representation of the style of long gloves in the Regency era; fashion plates from the period do not appear to show gloves with drawstring-type ties, but do often show women wearing gloves held up by garterlike straps or ribbons.)

In the period of the 1930s through early 1960s, the evening glove was adapted for wear with certain high end lounging and sleeping outfits, or peignoir sets. Such gloves were typically made out of the same lightweight sheer nylon, rayon, or silk as of the lingerie set in a matching or complementary color and always of above elbow length. These gloves were introduced to bring the fashion for covered hands into the bedroom, protect skin during sleep and leisure time, and provide modesty for women during times of travel, visitation, or shared accommodation. While never widespread, these sleeping gloves were a desired component of the most expensive bedroom ensembles. Given the prevalence of gloves in mid-20th century women's fashion, a woman who added sleeping gloves to her wardrobe would have been gloved virtually at all times.

Measurements
The length of ladies' evening gloves are referred to in terms of "buttons", whether they in fact have buttons or not. The word is derived from French, and the exact measure is actually a bit longer than one inch. Wrist length gloves are usually eight-button, those at the elbow are 16, mid-biceps are 22 and full shoulder length are 30. Opera gloves are between 16 and 22 inches long, though some gloves can be as long as 29 or 30 inches. To fit oneself for gloves, measure all around the hand at the widest part of the palm where the knuckles are, but excluding the thumb. The measurement in inches is the glove size, but if one's arms are large, it may be practical to go up a size. Generally, an evening glove is considered to be a true "opera-length" glove if it reaches to mid-biceps or higher on the wearer's arm, notwithstanding its actual length in inches or buttons; therefore, a petite woman might find a glove with a measurement of 16 or 17 inches adequate for the purpose, while a tall woman might need a glove longer than 22 inches. A glove shorter than elbow-length is not considered an "opera-length glove" or "opera glove".

Gallery

References

External links
The History of the Opera Glove
How to make Gloves

Gloves
Fashion accessories
Formal insignia